Per Olov Enquist, also known as P. O. Enquist, (23 September 1934 – 25 April 2020) was a Swedish author. He had worked as a journalist, playwright and novelist.

Biography
He was the only son of a single mother, who became a widow when he was half a year old. In his youth, he was a promising athlete with a high jump personal best of 1.97 meters. He studied at Uppsala University, receiving a degree in the history of literature.

During his time in Uppsala he started writing, his first novel Kristallögat being published in 1961, and became a newspaper journalist. Enquist won the Nordic Council's Literature Prize in 1968 for Legionärerna, his account of Sweden's deportation of Baltic-country soldiers at the end of the second world war which also became his international breakthrough. He would write several more books based on true events, including Kapten Nemos bibliotek (1991) about  where two newly born boys were accidentally switched, Livläkarens besök (1999), Lewis resa (2001) about Pentecostalist Lewi Pethrus, and Boken om Blanche och Marie (2004) about Marie Curie and mental patient Marie "Blanche" Wittman. Enquist's first stage play was Tribadernas natt (1975), a story about Swedish author August Strindberg, his soon-to-be ex-wife Siri von Essen, and von Essen's presumed lover .

Awards for his writing have included the Dobloug Prize in 1988, the Selma Lagerlöf Prize in 1997, and the Italian Flaiano Prize in 2002. Besides books and stage plays, Enquist also wrote screenplays for motion pictures, including Pelle Erövraren (1987) and Hamsun (1996), and at the 27th Guldbagge Awards in 1993, Enquist was nominated for the award for Best Screenplay for the film Il Capitano: A Swedish Requiem. He also received the Independent Foreign Fiction Prize as well as the Nelly Sachs Prize in 2003 for Livläkarens besök, based on the true story of Johann Friedrich Struensee, who was the mentally ill Danish King Christian VII's physician, and his political machinations and relationship with Christian's wife Caroline Matilda in the 1770s. Livläkarens besök also became the first of two books Enquist wrote that were awarded the August Prize, the other being his 2008 autobiography Ett annat liv. Enquist was awarded the Austrian State Prize for European Literature in 2009 and the Swedish Academy's Nordic Prize in 2010.

Enquist died on 25 April 2020 after a prolonged struggle with cancer.

Bibliography 
 (1961)
 (1963)
 (1964). 
 (1964). Written under the pseudonym "Peter Husberg" along with Torsten Ekbom and Leif Nylén. 
 (1966)
 (1966)
Legionärerna: En roman om baltutlämningen (1968)
 (1971)
 (1972). 
 (1974). 
 (1975)
 (1976). 
 (1978). 
Mannen på trottoaren (1979). 
 (1980). Based on the myth of Phaedra. 
Från regnormarnas liv (1981)
En triptyk (1981). A collection of his works Tribadernas natt, Till Fedra, and Från regnormarnas liv. 
 (1982). 
Strindberg. Ett liv (1984). 
 (1985). 
Två reportage om idrott (1986). 
Protagoras sats (1987). 
 (1988). 
 (1991). 
 (1992). 
Bildmakarna (1998)
Livläkarens besök (1999). 
 (2001). 
 (2003)
 (2004).  English translation as The Book about Blanche and Marie, 2006 
Ett annat liv ("A different life", autobiography) (2008). 
 (2010)
 (2013).

References

External links 

1934 births
2020 deaths
People from Skellefteå Municipality
Writers from Västerbotten
Swedish-language writers
20th-century Swedish dramatists and playwrights
20th-century Swedish novelists
21st-century Swedish novelists
Swedish historical novelists
Uppsala University alumni
Sommar (radio program) hosts
Selma Lagerlöf Prize winners
Dobloug Prize winners
Nordic Council Literature Prize winners
Litteris et Artibus recipients
August Prize winners
Best Screenplay Guldbagge Award winners
Members of the Academy of Arts, Berlin
Articles containing video clips
Male screenwriters
Swedish male novelists
Swedish male dramatists and playwrights
21st-century Swedish dramatists and playwrights